Hilda Verónica Riveros Izquierdo (born 23 April 1987), known as Verónica Riveros, is a Paraguayan professional footballer who plays as a centre back for Brazilian Série A1 club Avaí FC and the Paraguay women's national team.

International career
Riveros represented Paraguay at the 2006 South American U-20 Women's Championship. At senior level, she played four Copa América Femenina editions (2006, 2010, 2014 and 2018).

International goals
Scores and results list Paraguay's goal tally first

References

External links

1987 births
Living people
Paraguayan women's footballers
Women's association football central defenders
São José Esporte Clube (women) players
Campeonato Brasileiro de Futebol Feminino Série A1 players
Paraguay women's international footballers
Paraguayan expatriate women's footballers
Paraguayan expatriate sportspeople in Brazil
Expatriate women's footballers in Brazil
20th-century Paraguayan women
21st-century Paraguayan women